Otter Browser is a cross-platform web browser that aims to recreate aspects of Opera 12.x using Qt framework while keeping seamless integration with users' desktop environments. Otter Browser is licensed under GPL-3.0-or-later. It works on Linux-based operating systems, FreeBSD, OpenBSD, macOS, and Windows platforms (others in development).

History
Following the decision by the board to change focus at Opera Software towards quarterly profits, co-founder Jon von Tetzchner left the company. Opera then announced that it would switch from the Presto layout engine that it had developed to the WebKit rendering engine, also used by Google Chromium project. It later followed Chrome again when it changed to the Blink rendering engine. Around the same time, the Opera community website My Opera was closed down. The new Opera left many of its users disgruntled.

At this time, Michał Dutkiewicz began creating Otter Browser.

The first iteration of the browser was released in 2014—an alpha release in binary form and source code. A notable aspect of the emergent browser is its modular model, making it possible for users to replace components.

Features 
 Password manager
 Addon manager
 Content blocking
 Spell checking
 Customisable GUI
 URL completion
 Speed dial
 Bookmarks and various related features
 Mouse gestures
 User style sheets

References

External links
 

Web browsers
Internet suites
Software based on WebKit
Web browsers that use Qt